"Come Down in Time" is the second track on Elton John's third album, Tumbleweed Connection, released in 1970. The lyrics were written by Bernie Taupin, Elton's long time writing partner. The song was originally recorded for John's second album, Elton John.

Covers and other versions
The song was covered by Al Kooper on his 1971 album, New York City (You're a Woman), then later covered by Sting on the 1991 album Two Rooms: Celebrating the Songs of Elton John & Bernie Taupin. Norwegian jazz singer Radka Toneff also recorded the song for her 1982 album Fairy Tales, which features herself with Steve Dobrogosz on piano. A soulful version of the song was released as a 7" single by soul singer Eugene Pitt and his band the Jyve Fyve in 1970 on the AVCO Embassy (AVE-4568) label. The song was also covered by Judy Collins on her 1976 album "Bread And Roses." Lani Hall recorded the song in 1972 for her 1st solo album, "Sun Down Lady", on A&M Records. It was covered by Laura Fernández in 2020 for her Okay, Alright album.

In October 2020, John issued a 10-inch vinyl only "jazz" version, backed by members of Hookfoot, recorded during the Tumbleweed Connection sessions, but not used on the album. The track's release coincided with the 50th anniversary re-release of Tumbleweed Connection, and was uncovered during archival research for John's box set Jewel Box. a multi-disc collection of early demos, and other rarities and B-sides, many of which were never previously released.

Meaning and melody
Come Down in Time is one of the two exceptions to the primarily Western (USA) musical themes of Tumbleweed Connection. The album was recorded at London's Trident Studio in March 1970, produced by Gus Dudgeon, and released in October 1970.

Set in the keys of A minor and D major, the song starts with an evocative harp introduction augmented by natural guitar harmonics.  
Conductor and orchestral arranger Paul Buckmaster's use of strings, harp, oboe, and horn set a plaintive and haunting mood.

Though originally using harp as the primary instrumental accompaniment, in his live sets Elton primarily replaced it with the piano. Despite not being a hit, the song was performed live in 1970, 1971, 1989, 1995, and subsequent solo tours, the last performances of the song included Ray Cooper on percussion in 2009. It was also performed as a duet by John and Sting on stage at a Rainforest Benefit concert in 1991 and again on the television program "An Audience with Elton John" in 1997.

The song maintains a steady, even tempo throughout, containing little of John's signature crescendos.  The song itself outlines a conversation between a man and his lover; she urges him to come meet her one night.  As he is walking and nears their agreed upon meeting place, he wonders whether she will be there or if he will be left alone to count the stars.

Personnel 
Elton John – vocals
Skaila Kanga – harp
Les Thatcher – acoustic guitar
Karl Jenkins – oboe
Herbie Flowers – bass guitar
Chris Laurence – acoustic bass
Barry Morgan – drums
Paul Buckmaster – arranger, conductor

References

 John, Sir Elton and Taupin, Bernie. "Come Down in Time."  Tumbleweed Connection.  Mercury Records; 1970.

Elton John songs
Songs with lyrics by Bernie Taupin
1970 songs
Songs with music by Elton John
Song recordings produced by Gus Dudgeon